This is a list of college football venues with non-traditional field colors. Traditionally, college football is played on grass fields. As technology advanced, the use of various kinds of artificial turf as a playing surface became more and more popular. With the artificial turf came the ability to have field colors other than green. Although many programs that choose an artificial surface for games do keep a green surface, a few have chosen other colors.

It is common for the end zones to be painted a different color, but as of the 2015 season only seven programs have their field color other than the traditional green. Six of the programs participate in the NCAA and one in the NAIA.

Conference affiliations are current for the upcoming 2018 college football season.

Other levels of play with non-traditional colors
Other programs outside of college football have non-traditional colors. Lincoln College Preparatory Academy in Kansas City, Missouri has blue turf with yellow sidelines surrounded by a red track. Barrow High School in Barrow, Alaska also has a blue turf, as do high schools in Hidalgo, Texas; Santee, California; Lovington, New Mexico; Ravenna, Ohio; Colonia, New Jersey; Oxford, Michigan; and Spotsylvania, Virginia. West Salem High School in Salem, Oregon has a black field. St. Mary's Preparatory in Orchard Lake Village, Michigan has red turf, as does Edgewood High School (Indiana) in Ellettsville, Indiana. Trona High School in Trona, San Bernardino County, California has an all-dirt field, the only one in the United States outside of Alaska. Belle Vernon Area School District uses a gold turf with black accents. Tenino High School has a black turf football field. Moore Catholic High School in Staten Island, New York unveiled its red turf field in 2021.

The Nebraska Danger of the Indoor Football League also play on a black field, while the Trenton Freedom of the Professional Indoor Football League began play in 2014 on a red field. From 2014 to 2016, the L.A. KISS of the Arena Football League played on a silver field.  Two teams currently in the National Arena League use non-traditional field colors.  The Lehigh Valley Steelhawks moved to Allentown, Pennsylvania in 2015, and began using a black field, while the Massachusetts Pirates began play in 2018 on a dark blue field.  The Buffalo Lightning of American Indoor Football, for convenience purposes, used a plain Haudenosaunee-purple field with no field markings except for goal lines; the Lightning play their games on a hastily converted box lacrosse court.

The National Football League has prohibited the use of non-traditional field colors without league permission since 2011, and no team in the league has ever attempted doing so.

Image gallery

References

Non-traditional field colors